Geraz do Lima Carriage Museum is a museum in Geraz do Lima, Viana do Castelo, Portugal dedicated to Carriage.

It contains equine-related artifacts and artwork, as well as over 50 antique horse-drawn carriages from Europe and Americas.

Gallery

External links

 The Geraz do Lima Carriage museum

Museums in the Viana do Castelo District
Carriage museums
Transport museums in Portugal
Buildings and structures in Viana do Castelo